Krisztián Berki (born 18 March 1985 in Budapest) is a Hungarian artistic gymnast. He is a pommel horse specialist. In 2016 a pommel horse element of difficulty level 'E' was named after him.

Sports career

He is the 2012 Olympic Champion, the 2010, 2011, and 2014 World Champion, and the 2007 and 2009 World silver medalist. He is also the 2005, 2007, 2008, 2009, 2011 and 2012 European Champion on that event. He won the Universiade 2009 in Belgrade. In 2010 and 2011 he was elected Hungarian Sportsman of the year for his achievements.

He is currently rated as the best pommel horse worker of all time by the Fédération Internationale de Gymnastique. He is an athlete of Újpesti TE, and represented by STRONGAA Management.

2012 Summer Olympics

At the 2012 Summer Olympics Berki competed in and won the pommel horse competition, winning the gold medal with a score of 16.066, exactly the same score as British athlete Louis Smith, but was awarded the gold on a higher execution score.

References

External links
 
 

1985 births
Living people
Hungarian male artistic gymnasts
Gymnasts from Budapest
Medalists at the World Artistic Gymnastics Championships
Gymnasts at the 2012 Summer Olympics
Olympic gymnasts of Hungary
Olympic gold medalists for Hungary
Olympic medalists in gymnastics
Medalists at the 2012 Summer Olympics
Universiade medalists in gymnastics
Universiade gold medalists for Hungary
Medalists at the 2009 Summer Universiade
20th-century Hungarian people
21st-century Hungarian people